Prakash Padukone (born 10 June 1955) is a former Indian badminton player. He was ranked World No. 1 in 1980; the same year he became the first Indian to win the All England Open Badminton Championships. He was awarded the Arjuna award in 1972 and the Padma Shri in 1982 by the Government of India. He is one of the co-founders of Olympic Gold Quest, a foundation dedicated to the promotion of Olympic sports in India.

Early life
Padukone was born on 10 June 1955 in Bangalore in Karnataka.His native is Padukone,Kundapur,Udupi. His father, Ramesh, was a secretary of the Mysore Badminton Association.

Career
Prakash was initiated into the game by his father Ramesh Padukone, who was the Secretary of the "Mysore Badminton Association" for many years.

Padukone's first official tournament was the Karnataka state junior championship in 1962. Though he lost in the very first round, two years later he managed to win the state junior title. He changed his playing style into a more aggressive style in 1971, and won the Indian national junior title in 1972. He also won the senior title the same year. He won the National title consecutively for the next seven years. In 1978, he won his first major international title, the men's singles gold medal at the 1978 Commonwealth Games in Edmonton, Canada. In 1979, he won the "Evening of Champions" at the Royal Albert Hall, London.

In 1980, he won the Danish Open, the Swedish Open and became the first Indian to win the men's singles title at the All England Championship with a victory over Indonesian rival Liem Swie King. He spent much of his international career training in Denmark, and developed close friendships with European players such as Morten Frost.

Other services

After his retirement from competitive sports in 1991, Padukone served as the chairman of the Badminton Association of India for a short while. He also served as the coach of the Indian national badminton team from 1993 to 1996. He co-founded Olympic Gold Quest with Geet Sethi, a foundation dedicated to the promotion of Olympic sports in India.

Personal life

Padukone married Ujjala. They have two daughters, Deepika and Anisha.

Achievements

World Championships 
Men's singles

World Cup 
Men's singles

World Games 
Men's singles

Asian Championships 
Men's singles

Commonwealth Games 
Men's singles

International tournaments 
Men's singles

Men's doubles

Invitational tournaments 

Men's doubles

References

External links

Authorised Biography
 Video interview of Prakash Padukone talking about early days of badminton in India, the sport, his superstitions, badminton, IBL, sport films and Deepika Padukone

1955 births
Living people
Indian male badminton players
Konkani people
Indian national badminton champions
Indian badminton coaches
Recipients of the Padma Shri in sports
Recipients of the Arjuna Award
Racket sportspeople from Bangalore
World No. 1 badminton players
Commonwealth Games medallists in badminton
Commonwealth Games gold medallists for India
Badminton players at the 1978 Commonwealth Games
Asian Games medalists in badminton
Asian Games bronze medalists for India
Badminton players at the 1974 Asian Games
Badminton players at the 1978 Asian Games
Badminton players at the 1986 Asian Games
Medalists at the 1974 Asian Games
Medalists at the 1986 Asian Games
World Games medalists in badminton
World Games bronze medalists
Competitors at the 1981 World Games
Medallists at the 1978 Commonwealth Games